Hypostomus auroguttatus is a species of catfish in the family Loricariidae. It is native to South America, where it occurs in the Paraíba do Sul basin in large rapids with rocky substrates. The species reaches 34 cm (13.4 inches) in total length and is believed to be a facultative air-breather. It is reportedly possible that the name Hypostomus auroguttatus is a senior synonym of Hypostomus luetkeni due to supposed confusion involving type localities, meaning that a new name may be necessary for H. auroguttatus auctorum multorum.

References 

Fish described in 1854
auroguttatus